George Mireku Duker (born 9 May 1975) is a Ghanaian from Dompim Pepesa in Tarkwa Nsuaem Constituency, politician and member of the Seventh Parliament of the Fourth Republic of Ghana representing the Tarkwa-Nsuaem Constituency in the Western Region on the ticket of the New Patriotic Party.

Politics 
He was first elected to parliament in 2016 and is a member of the New Patriotic Party. He pulled more votes for the New Patriotic Party, in the Western Region of Ghana.

Early life and education 
He was born on 9 May 1975. Duker studied B.ED Accounting University of Education – Kumasi Campus, later MSC Oil and Gas Management University of Plymouth – UK.

Career 
Prior to parliament, he served as a teacher from 1998 to 2006 (Ghana Education Service), Special Aide from 2007 to 2008 (Ministry of Local Government, Ghana), Municipal Chief Executive under President John Agyekum Kuffour administration in 2008. Duker was also the Programs Manager of  Integrated Social Development Centre (ISODEC) from 2011 to 2012.

Mineral Income Investment Fund 
President Akuffo Addo on Friday, 28 August 2020 accented to the Minerals Income Investment Fund (MIIF) and appointed George Mireku Duker as its first chairperson. The fund is to manage the equity interest of the Republic of Ghana mining companies to receive minerals royalties and other related income due the republic from mining operations.

Committee assignments 
 Mines and Energy, Vice Chairman
 Holding Offices of Profit, Member

References 

Ghanaian MPs 2017–2021
Living people
New Patriotic Party politicians
Ghanaian MPs 2021–2025
1975 births